The 1941 St. Louis Cardinals season was the team's 60th season in St. Louis, Missouri and the 50th season in the National League. The Cardinals went 97–56 during the season and finished 2nd in the National League.

Offseason 
 Prior to 1941 season (exact date unknown)
Hal Rice was signed as an amateur free agent by the Cardinals.
Tommy Glaviano was signed as an amateur free agent by the Cardinals.
Chuck Diering was signed as an amateur free agent by the Cardinals.

Regular season

Season standings

Record vs. opponents

Notable transactions 
 June 21, 1941: Jimmy Ripple was purchased by the Cardinals from the Cincinnati Reds.
 September 2, 1941: Hank Gornicki was purchased from the Cardinals by the Chicago Cubs.
 September 22, 1941: The purchase of Hank Gornicki's contract from the Cardinals by the Cubs was voided, and Gornicki was returned to the Cardinals.

Roster

Player stats

Batting

Starters by position 
Note: Pos = Position; G = Games played; AB = At bats; H = Hits; Avg. = Batting average; HR = Home runs; RBI = Runs batted in

Other batters 
Note: G = Games played; AB = At bats; H = Hits; Avg. = Batting average; HR = Home runs; RBI = Runs batted in

Pitching

Starting pitchers 
Note: G = Games pitched; IP = Innings pitched; W = Wins; L = Losses; ERA = Earned run average; SO = Strikeouts

Other pitchers 
Note: G = Games pitched; IP = Innings pitched; W = Wins; L = Losses; ERA = Earned run average; SO = Strikeouts

Relief pitchers 
Note: G = Games pitched; W = Wins; L = Losses; SV = Saves; ERA = Earned run average; SO = Strikeouts

Farm system 

LEAGUE CHAMPIONS: Columbus (American Assn.), Mobile, New Iberia

Notes

References 
1941 St. Louis Cardinals at Baseball Reference
1941 St. Louis Cardinals team page at www.baseball-almanac.com

St. Louis Cardinals seasons
Saint Louis Cardinals season
St Louis Cardinals